Historic Performances Recorded at the Monterey International Pop Festival is a live album recorded at the Monterey Pop Festival in June 1967. A split artist release, it includes some of the performances by the Jimi Hendrix Experience on side one and Otis Redding on side two. It has been supplanted by later more comprehensive releases, Live at Monterey (Hendrix, 2007) and Captured Live at the Monterey International Pop Festival (Do It Just One More Time!) (Redding, 2019).

Release and charts
Reprise Records released Historic Performances in the United States on August 26, 1970, less than a month before Hendrix died. It reached number 16 on the Billboard 200 albums chart and number 15 on the magazine's Top R&B Albums chart. The Recording Industry Association of America certified it as a gold album, signifying one million dollars in sales.  The album was not released in the United Kingdom.

Critical reception

In a contemporary review of the album, Jeffrey Drucker of Rolling Stone magazine said "memories are made of sets like this", and "even if you weren't [there], you'll find some very satisfying music by two of our most gifted artists."

In Christgau's Record Guide: Rock Albums of the Seventies (1981), music critic Robert Christgau called the album "as evocative a distillation of the hippie moment in all its hope and contradiction as you'll ever hear." He described Redding and Hendrix as "two radically different black artists showboating at the nativity of the new white rock audience", who had both "performed more subtly and more brilliantly" elsewhere, and were "equally audacious and equally wonderful" at the festival.

In a lukewarm review, AllMusic's Bruce Eder regarded Historic Performances as a significant album when it was released, but it has become "purely of historic interest as an artifact of the time."

Track listing

Personnel
Side one
 Jimi Hendrix – electric guitar, vocals
 Noel Redding – bass guitar
 Mitch Mitchell – drums

Side two
 Otis Redding – vocals
 Booker T. Jones – keyboards
 Steve Cropper – electric guitar
 Donald "Duck" Dunn – bass guitar
 Al Jackson Jr. – drums
 Wayne Jackson – trumpet
 Andrew Love – tenor saxophone

Production
 Producers: Lou Adler, John Phillips
 Engineers: Wally Heider, Eric Weinberg
 Photography: Jim Marshall
 Cover Layout: Ed Thrasher

References

Bibliography

External links 
 

Otis Redding albums
Live albums published posthumously
Albums produced by Lou Adler
Jimi Hendrix live albums
Split albums
1970 live albums
Albums produced by John Phillips (musician)